So Far from Home is the first installment in a space-themed trilogy released by Christian rock band Brave Saint Saturn. This release contains fewer elements of the trilogy's plot that was developed in the two subsequent albums, opting for a more general feeling of darkness and loneliness.  It was released in 2000.

Lyricist Reese Roper shows his typical awareness of social issues, albeit with an unusual melancholy. "Under Bridges" samples clips from the Apollo 8 Genesis reading and tackles homelessness, through a contemporary interpretation of the Parable of the Sheep and the Goats. "Two-Twenty-Nine" keeps with the space theme, beginning with a clip from the countdown sequence of the Space Shuttle Challenger disaster, and relays the personal loss of his grandmother.

The album cover includes NASA image STS082-320-029.

Track listing
 "Prologue"
 "Space Robot Five"
 "Independence Day"
 "Shadow Of Def"
 "Resistor"
 "Fireworks"
 "Under Bridges"
 "Data Stream One"
 "Rocketown"
 "Moon Burns Bright"
 "Two-Twenty-Nine"
 "Gloria"

Personnel
Reese Roper - Lead Vocals
Mike Busbee - Keyboard
Jeff Campitrelli - Drums and percussion
Scott Kerr - Electric Guitar
Tony Lacido - Bass
Masaki Liu - Strings & guitar
Big Lou The Accordion Princess - Accordion 
Micah Ortega - Turntables
Monica Smith - Background Vocals
Frank Tate - "Mad Rap Skills"
Andrew Verdechhio - Drums
Eric Wood - Drums

References

Brave Saint Saturn albums
2000 debut albums
Concept albums